Dewperkash Gajadin (born 26 January 1961) is a Surinamese chess player who holds the title of FIDE Master (FM, 2010). He is a Surinamese Chess Championship winner (1983), Chess Olympiad individual gold medalist (1984), and FIDE Arbiter (2012).

Biography
In 1983, Dewperkash Gajadin won the Surinamese Chess Championship. In 2007, he won the international chess tournament Suriname Open. In 2013, Dewperkash Gajadin won a bronze medal in the Surinamese Chess Championship. He ranked 4th in the Surinamese Chess Championship in 2014 and 5th in 2016.

Dewperkash Gajadin played for Suriname in the Chess Olympiads:
 in 1984, at the first reserve board in the 26th Chess Olympiad in Thessaloniki (+6, =2, -1) and won individual gold medal,
 in 2000, at the fourth board in the 34th Chess Olympiad in Istanbul (+5, =4, -3),
 in 2002, at the second board in the 35th Chess Olympiad in Bled (+5, =3, -3),
 in 2004, at the third board in the 36th Chess Olympiad in Calvià (+3, =2, -5),
 in 2006, at the first board in the 37th Chess Olympiad in Turin (+4, =2, -3),
 in 2008, at the second board in the 38th Chess Olympiad in Dresden (+3, =0, -6),
 in 2010, at the second board in the 39th Chess Olympiad in Khanty-Mansiysk (+5, =2, -2),
 in 2012, at the second board in the 40th Chess Olympiad in Istanbul (+1, =3, -4),
 in 2014, at the first board in the 41st Chess Olympiad in Tromsø (+2, =1, -4),
 in 2016, at the third board in the 42nd Chess Olympiad in Baku (+2, =3, -3),
 in 2018, at third board in the 43rd Chess Olympiad in Batumi (+2, =0, -6).

References

External links
 
 
 

1961 births
Living people
Surinamese chess players
Chess FIDE Masters
Chess Olympiad competitors